Constantine Group is a British family-owned company founded in 1885 by Joseph Constantine.

The company started out as a shipping company and in 1885, Joseph Constantine invested in his first ship Homewood, a three-masted timber sailing barque, the start of a shipping fleet which by the start of the First World War consisted of 22 ocean-going steamers and six coastal vessels.

In 1922, Joseph Constantine died and was succeeded by his two sons, Robert Constantine and William Constantine. In 1930, Constantine Technical College (now Teesside University) in Middlesbrough was opened.

In the 1950s, the company had three increasingly distinct business areas ships, shipping services and property, and several blocks of flats were developed in London including 100 Lancaster Gate and St James's Close.

In the 1960s, Robert and William Constantine retired, and Robert Constantine's sons, Norman and Joe, became chairman and CEO respectively.

In 1969, they bought Connells estate agents, and in 1984 it was listed on the London Stock Exchange, and sold in 1991, when it had 130 branches.

References

British companies established in 1885
Family-owned companies of the United Kingdom